The following individuals were Earls (suo jure or jure uxoris) or Countesses (suo jure) during the reign of King Edward II of England who reigned from 1307 to 1327.

The period of tenure as Earl or Countess is given after the name and title of each individual, including any period of minority.

Earl of Arundel
Edmund FitzAlan, 9th Earl of Arundel (1302-1326)
Earl of Carlisle
Andrew Harclay, 1st Earl of Carlisle (1322-1323)
Earl of Chester
Edward of Windsor, Earl of Chester (1312-1327)
Earl of Cornwall
Piers Gaveston, 1st Earl of Cornwall (1308-1312)
Earl of Derby
Thomas, 2nd Earl of Lancaster (1296-1322)
Earl of Essex
Humphrey de Bohun, 4th Earl of Hereford, 3rd Earl of Essex (1298-1322)
John de Bohun, 5th Earl of Hereford, 4th Earl of Essex (1322-1336)
Earl of Gloucester
Ralph de Monthermer, 1st Baron Monthermer, Earl of Gloucester jure uxoris (1295-1307)
Gilbert de Clare, 8th Earl of Gloucester, (1308-1314)
Earl of Hereford
Humphrey de Bohun, 4th Earl of Hereford (1298-1322)
John de Bohun, 5th Earl of Hereford (1322-1336)
Earl of Hertford
Ralph de Monthermer, 1st Baron Monthermer, Earl of Hertford jure uxoris (1295-1307)
Gilbert de Clare, 8th Earl of Gloucester, 7th Earl of Hertford (1308-1314)
Earl of Kent
Edmund of Woodstock, 1st Earl of Kent (1321-1330)
Earl of Lancaster
Thomas, 2nd Earl of Lancaster (1296-1322)
Henry, 3rd Earl of Lancaster (1327-1345)
Earl of Leicester
Thomas, 2nd Earl of Lancaster, 2nd Earl of Leicester (1296-1322)
Henry, 3rd Earl of Lancaster,  3rd Earl of Leicester (1324-1345)
Earl of Lincoln
Henry de Lacy, 3rd Earl of Lincoln (1272-1311)
Alice de Lacy, 4th Countess of Lincoln suo jure (1311-1348)
Earl of Norfolk
Thomas of Brotherton, 1st Earl of Norfolk (1312-1338)
Earl of Oxford
Robert de Vere, 6th Earl of Oxford (1296-1331)
Earl of Pembroke
Aymer de Valence, 2nd Earl of Pembroke (1296-1324)
Earl of Richmond
John of Brittany, Earl of Richmond (1306-1334)
Earl of Salisbury
Margaret Longespée, 4th Countess of Salisbury suo jure (1261-1310)
Alice de Lacy, 5th Countess of Salisbury suo jure (1310-1322)
Earl of Surrey
John de Warenne, 7th Earl of Surrey (1304-1347)
Earl of Warwick
Guy de Beauchamp, 10th Earl of Warwick (1298-1315)
Thomas de Beauchamp, 11th Earl of Warwick (1315-1369)
Earl of Winchester
Hugh le Despenser, 1st Earl of Winchester (1322-1326)

References

Sources 

Ellis, Geoffrey. (1963) Earldoms in Fee: A Study in Peerage Law and History. London: The Saint Catherine Press, Limited.

Earls